Peter of Alençon may refer to:

Peter I, Count of Alençon (1251–1284), son of King Louis IX of France
Peter II, Count of Alençon (1330–1404)